The 1916 season of Úrvalsdeild was the fifth season of league football in Iceland. The same three teams participated that entered last year with Fram winning the championship for a fourth time in a row.

League standings

Results

References

Úrvalsdeild karla (football) seasons
Iceland
Iceland
Urvalsdeild